Lars Conrad (born 1 June 1976) is an Olympic and national record holding freestyle swimmer from Germany. He swam for Germany at 2000 and 2004 Olympics.

At the 2004 Olympics, he was part of Germany's silver-medal winner 4×100 m medley relay, alongside Steffen Driesen, Jens Kruppa, and Thomas Rupprath.

See also
  :de:Lars Conrad – entry from German Wikipedia.
  Official homepage Lars Conrad

References

freestyle

1976 births
Living people
Swimmers from Berlin
Olympic swimmers of Germany
Swimmers at the 2000 Summer Olympics
Swimmers at the 2004 Summer Olympics
Olympic silver medalists for Germany
German male freestyle swimmers
World Aquatics Championships medalists in swimming
Medalists at the FINA World Swimming Championships (25 m)
European Aquatics Championships medalists in swimming
Medalists at the 2004 Summer Olympics
Olympic silver medalists in swimming